Goan literature is the literature pertaining to the state of Goa in India.

Goa has a population of around 1.4 million and an area of 3,700 sq. kilometres (1,430 sq. miles). For a small region, it has a significant amount of publication activity, possibly in part because its people write in a number of languages—perhaps as many as 13—and also because of the large expatriate and diaspora population of Goans settled across the globe.

Among its most noted writers are Laxmanrao Sardessai (1904–1986) and R. V. Pandit (1917–1990), both of whom wrote poetry and prose in Marathi, Konkani, and Portuguese; Shenoi Goembab (1877–1946), whose Konkani writing helped to establish Konkani as a modern literary language; Ravindra Kelekar (1925–2010), who wrote some of the twentieth century's foremost Konkani literature; and Pundalik Naik (born 1952), whose 1977 novel Acchev was the first Konkani novel to be translated into English.

History 

Goa was the first place in Asia to have a printing press, which was brought by the Jesuits in 1556. Nearly all of Goan literature before that time is known to have been destroyed by the Portuguese during the imposition of Inquisition. Goa's Portuguese colonial rulers can hardly be credited with meticulous record-keeping of Goan literature. Thus, Goa has had a long love affair with the written and printed word, although growth has been slow, and punctuated by problems like linguistic breaks and censorship.

Peter Nazareth points out that Goans have written in thirteen languages, of which the chief are Konkani, Marathi, English and Portuguese. Nazareth describes Goans as 'cultural brokers':

Goans mediate between cultures, Goans live between different cultures, Goans are travellers from one part of the world to another. This, in my opinion, happened when East and West met in Goans under pressure with the Portuguese conquest. Since that time, our usefulness to the world, wherever we are, is that we can understand different cultures and help people from different cultures understand one another. The disadvantage is that if we don't work on it, we may end up not knowing who we are.

Literary writing in Goa began to take shape under Portuguese rule and influence, associated with Portugal's mid-nineteenth-century Regeneration, which saw the reintroduction of the press to Goa, along with expanded Portuguese education. A spate of Portuguese-language publications, 'such as A Biblioteca de Goa (1839), O Enciclopédico (1841–1842), O Compilador (1843–1847), O Gabinete Literário das Fontainhas (1846–1848), A revista Ilustrativa (1857–1866) and O Arquivo Portugués Oriental (1857–1866)', along with Júlio Gonçalves's Ilustraçao Goana (1864–1866), while often short-lived, provided new fora not only for the circulation of European literature (whether originally in Portuguese or in translation), but provided growing opportunities for Goans to publish literary and scholarly writing.

The first novel published by a Goan was Os Brahamanes (The Brahmans) by Francisco Luis Gomes, published in 1866.

Later in the nineteenth century, vernacular writing began to emerge in strength, for example in Konkani, the widely spoken local vernacular. The Goan writer Shenoi Goembab (1877–1946) was foundational to developing modern Konkani literature. An official language of the region since 1987, Konkani is now studied in schools. Konkani literature emerged alongside the rapid growth of Marathi literature, in which the Goan R. V. Pandit was a notable exponent.  S. M. Tadkodkar, who was conferred PhD degree by Goa University for his exhaustive research work on Anant Kaakaba Priolkar, contends that while the Kannadd language of Karnataka province was dominating the Goan culture, Marathi language and culture was embraced by Goans. Now, Marathi has embraced the Goans and would not leave them, willingly. Maximum literature is published in Marathi. There are 8 Marathi dailies published from Goa. Prominent among them are Dianik Gomantak, Tarun Bharat, Lokamat, Navaprabha, Pudhari, Goadoot. The Marathi daily Lokmat has the highest circulation (50000+) among all dailies.

In the late nineteenth century, extensive contacts with and migration to British-ruled India also encouraged English-language Goan writing, with early exponents including Joseph Furtado. Edward D'Lima, who has done his PhD on the Goan writer Armando Menezes, argues that Goan writing in English goes back to the late nineteenth century, when Goans were migrating out of this Portuguese-controlled colony in favour of jobs in the growing English-speaking British-ruled colonial world. English is probably the most influential literary language in Goa: 'a surge of creativity has erupted in Goan literature in English since 2000 in fiction and nonfiction, drama and poetry'.

Goan writers
Besides English, Konkani and Marathi, Goans, particularly those of the past generation, have contributed significantly to writings in Portuguese.

Resources for and about Goan writers

Goa University institutional repository, languages and literature section
The Goa Archives
Fundação Oriente, Panjim-based Portuguese cultural body, which has helped some writers with small grants of a few thousand rupees.
 Goa University Library: It has a large collections in the languages of Konkani, Marathi, English, Portuguese, French. It has old manuscripts, microfilms and prints of the 17th century in Goa.
 Goa State Central Library, which is run by the Government of Goa, is the oldest library in South Asia. It has been one of the largest depositories of printed volumes pertaining to Goan languages and literature since the seventeenth century.

Goa Arts and Literary Festival
Goa Arts and Literary Festival (GALF) is a non- profit festival organised by volunteers. The first edition of GALF was held in 2010. The three-day fest had debates, lectures and discussions on art, music, photography, drawing a large audience from across the world at the International Centre of Goa, Dona Paula.

Bibliography
COSTA, Aleixo Manuel da. Dicionário de literatura goesa. Instituto Cultural de Macau, Fundação Oriente, 3 v., 1997.
DEVI, Vimala, & SEABRA, Manuel de. A literatura indo-portuguesa. Junta de Investigações do Ultramar, 2 v., 1971.
NAZARETH, Peter (ed.). "Goan Literature: A Modern Reader", Journal of South Asian Literature Winter-Spring 1983.

Sources

"Goan Literature: A Modern Reader", Journal of South Asian Literature Winter-Spring 1983

Translated in Manohar Shetty's Ferry Crossing

See also 

 Konkani language
 Konkani words from other languages

External links 
Goabooks site
Archive of Goan Writing in Portuguese

Indian literature
Culture of Goa
Konkani